Bjørgaas is a Norwegian surname. Notable people with the surname include:

Olav Bjørgaas (1926–2019), Norwegian physician 
Tove Bjørgaas (born 1972), Norwegian television correspondent

Norwegian-language surnames